The Singapore Police Force (SPF) is the national and principal law enforcement agency responsible for the prevention of crime and law enforcement in the Republic of Singapore. It is the country's lead agency against organised crime; human and weapons trafficking; cyber crime; as well as economic crimes that goes across domestic and international borders, but can be tasked to investigate any crime under the purview of the Ministry of Home Affairs (MHA) and is accountable to the Parliament of Singapore.

SPF's main geographical area of responsibilities covers the entire country, consisting of five regions which are further divided into 55 planning areas. The organisation has various staff departments with specific focuses. These include the Airport Police Division (APD), which covers policing of Singapore's main civilian airports of Changi and Seletar, or the Police Coast Guard (PCG), which protects and enforces areas under Singapore's territorial waters and its ports.

Formerly known as the Republic of Singapore Police (RSP), the SPF is a uniformed organisation. The SPF has declared its mission and vision as to "prevent, deter and detect crime to ensure the safety and security of Singapore". It is Singapore's point of contact for foreign agencies such as Interpol and other international law enforcement agencies. The organisational structure of the SPF is split between staff and line functions, which is roughly modelled after the Singapore Armed Forces (SAF).

The SPF currently consists of sixteen staff departments, four specialist staff departments, eighteen specialist and line units as well as seven land divisions. Its headquarters are located at one of the blocks of the New Phoenix Park building in the Novena district, which is located directly adjacent to a twin block occupied by the MHA. Situated within the headquarters are the Police Heritage Centre (PHC), which is open to the public and showcases the SPF's history through its various exhibits and multimedia displays.

As of 2020, the SPF has a strength of approximately 10,706 personnel: 9,571 sworn officers and 1,135 civilian staff. The SPF has generally been credited as being the forefront in keeping crime in Singapore low, as well as being relatively transparent in its policing. Accordingly, Singapore has been considered as being one of least corrupt and most safe countries in the world. The SPF also works closely with the Internal Security Department (ISD) and the Corrupt Practices Investigation Bureau (CPIB). As of 2022, the current Minister of Home Affairs is K Shanmugam, while the current commissioner of the SPF is Hoong Wee Teck.

History

Early years
The Singapore Police Force was founded in 1820, starting with just 11 men under the command of Francis James Bernard, the son-in-law of William Farquhar. With no background nor knowledge on policing, Bernard had to work from scratch, as well as occasionally turning to Farquhar for help. In addition, he held multiple roles as magistrate, chief jailer, harbour master, marine storekeeper, as well as personal assistants to Farquhar. Farquhar informed Raffles that he had provisionally introduced licenses for opium and alcohol sales that would raise $650 per month, with $300 of this sum being used to run a small police department.

As the department took form, Bernard became in charge of a writer, one jailor, one jemadar (sergeant) and eight peada (constables) by May 1820. Raffles approved these arrangements by August 1820 and cemented the formal establishment of a police force in Singapore. Manpower constraints meant that the men had to perform a wide range of roles, and required the help of headmen among the various ethnic communities to maintain orderliness on the streets.

Many laws that were enacted during this time remains in force today. These include the passing of Singapore's first arms law in March 1823, which heavily restricts the right to bear arms. Nearly two centuries later, these anti-arms laws continue to be strictly enforced, resulting in a society relatively free from firearms-related criminal offences.

1965–present
The SPF remains the sole policing force in Singapore after its independence. The country has one of the lowest murder rates in the world, as well as the lowest firearm-related death rates. The major crimes that tend to affect the Singaporean populace in the 21st century are usually cybercrimes, such as scams that are often based overseas. In 2020, it made up almost half of all crimes in Singapore.

Organisational structure

Leadership

Staff departments

Specialist staff departments

Specialist and land units

Land divisions are given designations according to the NATO phonetic alphabet.

Defunct land divisions include:
 Toa Payoh Police Division ('B' Division), merged with Tanglin Police Division
 Geylang Police Division ('C' Division), merged with Bedok Police Division

Finances
The Singapore Police Force receives the highest budget allocation annually as compared to the various departments of the Ministry of Home Affairs (MHA), typically accounting for about 50% of its annual budget. For the fiscal year of 2013 (for the year beginning 1 April 2013), S$3.89 billion was budgeted to the MHA, of which 47.8% or S$1.86 billion was allocated for the Police Programme. Actual expenses in the 2013 fiscal year were S$2.04 billion, of which S$1.88 billion was spent on operating expenditure (against the budgeted S$1.79 billion) and S$159.1 million on development expenditure (budgeted at $71.83 million). Manpower costs amounting to S$1.16 billion continue to dominate the SPF's expenditure, accounting for 61.7% of its operating expenditure and 56.9% of total expenditure in FY2013.

The latest budget for fiscal year 2015, S$2.47 billion was allocated to the Police Programme, or 49.5% of MHA's total budget of S$5 billion (the Ministry of Defence, in comparison, received a S$13.12 billion budget allocation). This includes S$2.26 billion for Operating Expenditure and $210.93 million for Development Expenditure. The main Development Expenditures expected in FY2015 included the construction of new buildings such as the Woodlands Police Divisional HQ as well as the acquisition of new patrol craft for the Police Coast Guard and the installation of police cameras at more HDB blocks and multi-storey car parks.

Manpower
, the total strength of the force stands at 43,116. Manpower trends in recent years are as follows:

Regulars
Regulars, or uniformed, full-time officers, constitute about 20% of the police's total workforce and number approximately 9,000 in strength. Basic entry requirements for police officers include normal fitness levels, good eyesight, and at least five passes in the GCE Ordinary level or a NITEC from the Institute of Technical Education, although those with lower qualifications may still be considered. Those joining the senior police officers require a basic degree from a recognised university. Alternatively, police officers from the junior ranks may also be considered for promotion into the senior ranks. Officers serving in the force as national servicemen are also regularly considered for absorption into the regular scheme. Basic training for all officers are conducted at the Home Team Academy, under the purview of the Police Training Command. It takes about six months and nine months to train a new police officer and senior police officer respectively.

As is the case with many other civil service positions in Singapore, the salaries of police officers are reviewed in accordance to market rates. Salaries are kept competitive as part of anti-corruption measures. Gross starting salaries for police officers may range from S$1,820 to S$2,480, and that of senior police officers from S$3,400 to S$4,770, depending on entry qualifications, relevant/useful work experiences and National Service.

Police officers commence their careers as Sergeants (Full GCE 'A' level or Diploma holders), while senior police officers start as Inspectors (Bachelor's degree). Reviews of an officer's performance for promotion consideration are conducted annually.

Police National Servicemen (PNS)
When full-time National Service (NS) was first introduced in Singapore in 1967, it was initially solely aimed and geared towards the building-up of the Singapore Armed Forces (SAF). Meanwhile, in Singapore Police Force, NS was not extended to that of compulsory full-time service, with police NS being only part-time, unlike that of the SAF. There was little urgency and pressure for the police force to increase its overall manpower-strength until the Laju incident of 1974, Singapore's first encounter with international terrorism, demonstrated the need for additionally trained reserve-officers who could be called up at short-notice in the event of a national crisis or a major and serious public emergency. Singapore's full-time National Service policy was thus extended to the Singapore Police Force in 1975, which stemmed from the then-primary aim of guarding and protecting key and vital public installations, such as sensitive ones like power substations and petrochemical industries, and to act as a swift-response reserve unit. Subsequent expansion of this NS scheme, along with changing security needs and requirements and the trend in outsourcing key-installation protection (such as to the various local auxiliary police forces) has expanded the role of police national servicemen to more varied functions, which may range from mainstream administration and operations (such as the role of Staff Assistants (SAs) based in offices), to basic police investigation (like the Ground Response Force (GRF) of the SPF's Land Divisions) and front line policing (as seen in the Police Coast Guard), alongside their regular counterparts.

Volunteers

Formed in 1946, The Volunteer Special Constabulary (VSC) is an important component of the Singapore Police Force, contributing more than fifty years of volunteer service to the nation.

The VSC is composed of volunteers from all walks of life in Singapore, from businessmen to blue-collar executives to even bus captains, bonded with the same aspiration to serve the nation by complementing the Singapore Police Force. They are vested with equal powers of a police officer to enforce law and order in Singapore. VSC Officers don the same police uniform and patrol the streets, participate in anti-drug operations and sometimes even high-speed sea chases.

Previously headquartered at the Eu Tong Sen Street Police Station and Toa Payoh Police Station, it relocated to the new Police Cantonment Complex in the year 2000.

Civilian staff
Civilian staff in the Police Force are deployed in areas such as technology, logistics, human resource, and administrative and financial services as well as investigation, planning and intelligence.
The civilian staff schemes fall under the general civil service schemes managed by the Public Service Division. These schemes include:
 Commercial Affairs Officer (CAO) Scheme for Accountancy, Law, Business Administration, Business or Economics degree holders
 Commercial Affairs Officer
 Home Team Specialist (HTS) Scheme for degree and diploma holders
 Home Team Specialist
 Home Affairs Senior Executive (HASE) Scheme for degree holders
 Management Executive (MX)
 Management Support Scheme for diploma holders and below
 Management Support Officer (MSO)
 Corporate Support Officer (CSO)
 Technical Support Scheme for diploma holders and below
 Technical Support Officer (TSO)

The civilization of non-core police functions has accelerated over the years in order to free up additional manpower for redeployment into Police Divisions. Other changes include the deployment of contract staff through organisations such as Ministry of Finance's VITAL.org for administrative staff and partners such as ST Engineering and Cyber Security Agency for technical support.

Staff welfare
 Aquatic Club
 Home United Basketball Club (HUBC)
 Home United Football Club (HUFC)
 JOM – Clubhouse for Police Officers
 Polwel Co-operative Society Limited
 Police Sports Association (PSA)
 Police Welfare Division
 Senior Police Officers' Mess (SPOM)
 Singapore Police Co-operative Society Limited

Uniforms

Dark blue is the organisational colour of the Singapore Police Force, and has remained so continuously since 1969. Derivatives of the standard blue uniform (collectively called the No. 3 uniform) was adopted for specialized forces and for all officers in various occasions which calls for more formal or casual attire.
The Traffic Police Department adopted a short-sleeved white tunic, dark blue breeches, a black leather Sam Browne belt, and riding boots for its officers performing mobile squad duties. A white crash helmet is worn when on the move, while a new dark blue jockey cap with chequered white and dark blue patterns around its circumference is worn when convenient while performing static duty. Members of the Vigilante Corps are also attired by a white short-sleeved top similar in design to the dark blue version for normal officers, gold-coloured buttons and badges, and a dark blue beret in place of the peaked cap.

Combat uniforms have also been adopted for specialist units such as those from the Special Operations Command and the Police Coast Guard (PCG), collectively known as the No. 4 uniforms. These involve the replacement of metal buttons with sewn-on plastic ones, the avoidance of all other metallic accruements which are deemed potentially hazardous to the officer or to others and the use of long-sleeved shirts.

The SPF introduced new uniforms made of 98% polyester and 2% spandex with better stretchable, perspiration absorption, and faster drying characteristics, as "part of ongoing efforts to improve officers' operational effectiveness and support them in their work". The word "police" is embroidered above the name tag of the new uniforms and the metallic buttons replaced with concealed plastic buttons for better comfort to allow officers put on the body vests over their uniforms. Riveted buttons are also fixed on the shoulders to allow the attachment of a body worn camera.

Ranks
The following rank structure is used throughout the police force:

The rank of corporal (CPL) was abolished in 1972, but reinstated in 1976. In 1997, the location of all rank devices was shifted from the sleeves to the shoulder epaulets except for the Gurkha Contingent. Also in the same year, the station inspector rank insignia was changed from collar pips to a coat of arms of Singapore with upward-pointing chevrons above and an arc below, a design similar to that of the warrant officers of the Singapore Armed Forces, while the rank of senior station inspector (SSI) was also introduced. In 1998, the senior station inspector (2) (SSI(2)) rank was introduced, and changes were made to the SI, SSI, and SSI(2) rank designs. The rank of lance corporal was abolished in 2002. In 2006, the Gurkha Contingent adopted embroidered ranks as part of an overhaul of its combat dress, but are worn on the right chest pocket.

In July 2016, a revamped rank overhaul was done with the retirement of the ranks of staff sergeant, senior station inspector (1) and senior station inspector (2), as well as the abolishment of the separation line between junior officers and senior officers, to unify a unified rank-scheme. In addition, the sergeant rank has three different grades noted by a number from 1 to 3 placed in parentheses and suffixed to the rank abbreviation; namely, SGT(1), SGT(2), and SGT(3).

Former ranks

Equipment

Weapons
Police officers in the various divisions are armed when conducting regular uniformed patrols and plainclothes duties. Officers from different units are issued with different weapons.

The five-shot .38 Taurus Model 85 with 3-inch barrel featuring a laser sight by Crimson Trace is the standard issued sidearm of the Singapore Police Force with 10 rounds of ammunition. In 2015, the SPF purchased a number of CZ P-07 semi-automatic pistols. From 2016, selected officers were issued with the pistols as a trial. In 2019, it was announced that the Glock 19 was chosen as a replacement to the Taurus revolver. In addition to the use of the handguns, the police also use the Heckler & Koch MP5 sub-machine gun and the Remington 870 shotgun.

Extendable batons were initially used by specialist units such as Security Command and Special Operations Command, however, it has since been used by officers from other front-line units, replacing the Monadnock PR-21 side-handle baton. Sabre Red pepper spray canisters are exclusively equipped to the officers of Police Coast Guard and Police Tactical Unit. A pair of handcuffs is issued to the officers as restraints.

The Taser X26E stun gun was procured in the late 2000s and is part of the officers' equipment, which provides another non-lethal means of subduing suspects. Despite safety concerns due to incidents experienced by foreign police forces, the weapon was deemed suitable for use by trained personnel, and was rolled out across other NPCs. In 2018, the Taser X26E was replaced with the X26P model.

Retired Weapons
 Sterling Mk IV SMG
 Sten Mk IV SMG
 Lee-Enfield No.4 Mk II bolt-action rifle and jungle carbine
 FN FAL / L1A1 Self-Loading Rifle
 Webley Mk IV .38 revolver
 Uzi SMG
 Mini Uzi carbine
 Federal Riot Gun
 Smith and Wesson Model 36 3" Revolver and 2" Hammer Shroud Revolver
 H&K P7 (limited use)
 Browning HP (limited use)
 Glock 34 (Police Shooting Team circa 1995)
 CP Truncheon

Vehicles

Land division officers typically patrol and respond to calls in vehicles known as the Fast Response Car (FRC). Car models that have been used by the SPF include the Subaru Impreza TS 1.6.

In 2005, the SPF introduced the new Fast Response Vehicle (FRV), consisting of modified Toyota Hi-Lux sport utility vehicles with a back compartment to carry equipment.

In 2009, the SPF introduced Forward Command Vehicles. These were replaced in 2017 by Division Command Vehicles with greater mobility designed to enhance command, control and coordination. In addition, the SPF introduced new unmanned aerial vehicles with red and blue siren lights, a searchlight, a high-definition camera and an audio warning system. The UAVs are controlled by two-man teams (consisting of a pilot and a safety officer) and are designed to conduct search and rescue operations, attending public order incidents, traffic management, hostage situations and crowd monitoring.

Police from the Community Policing Units may also patrol in residential neighbourhoods on bicycles. At the 2007 Singapore National Day Parade, the Singapore Police Force unveiled a Tenix S600 APC (Armored Personnel Carrier) had been purchased for its operations for the Special Operations Command, and in NDP 2015, the Achleitner HMV Survivor and the Gurkha MPV by Terradyne Armored Vehicles Inc was unveiled.

The various specialist units may also make use of other specialised equipment specific to their scope of duty

Other vehicles used by the various units include:

Land Divisions

Police Security Command
 Volvo XC60 – SUV
 Volvo S90 – Saloon
 Volvo S80 – Saloon
 Mitsubishi Pajero – SUV

Traffic Police
 BMW 2019 R1250RT – Motorcycle 
 Yamaha Diversion XJ900P – Motorcycle
 Volvo S80 – Saloon
 Subaru Impreza – Saloon
 BMW 325d – Saloon
 Iveco Daily – Van

Special Operations Command

Gurkha Contingent

Defunct divisions and establishments
 Old Police Academy – vacated in 2006, relocated to Old Choa Chu Kang Road as part of the Home Team Academy, leaving behind the Police National Service provost unit and Traffic Police driving test school. The accommodation barracks and training facilities of the Old Police academy currently houses the training departments for all auxiliary police forces in Singapore.
 Geylang Police Division defunct 'C' Division HQ – closed and vacated in 2000, areas of responsibility was divided between 'A', 'F' & 'G' Divisions. Station's status – Currently in use by Geylang NPC under 'G' Bedok Police Division and by Public Transport Security Command.
 Toa Payoh Police Division defunct 'B' Division HQ – closed and vacated in 1988, areas of responsibility was divided between 'E' & 'F' Divisions. Station was refurbished and is currently in use by Security Command.
 Police Radio Division (01°16′59″N 103°50′29″E) defunct "R" Division. Responsible for dispatching quick response "R" Division cars. Closed 1990s.

Land Divisions
 Beach Road Police Station – former site of 'A' Division HQ, vacated in 2000.
 Eu Tong Sen Street Police Station – former HQ site of CAD, CID & VSC since 1994, vacated in 2001 and was transferred to the charge of SLA. Station status pending.
 Joo Chiat Police Station – former site of 'G' Division HQ, vacated in 1987 and was transferred to the charge of SLA, which in turn released the premises for use by private developers.
 Old Hill Street Police Station – vacated in 1980, this old police station and barracks was renovated in 1983 and became part of MCCY and MCI.
 Paya Lebar Police Station – former site of 'F' Division HQ, vacated in 1987, now became 2nd Division HQ SCDF.
 Queenstown Police Station – former site of 'D' Division HQ, vacated in 1988, now became 1st Division HQ SCDF.
 Orchard Police Station – former site of 'E' Division HQ, demolished in 1983, now became ION Orchard and Orchard MRT station.
 Old Tanglin Police Station – former site of 'E' Division HQ, vacated in 2001, now became Interpol Global Complex for Innovation.
 Taman Jurong Police Station – vacated in 1980 and demolished in 1988, the surrounding land at the site has been redeveloped as a HDB housing precinct.
 Ama Keng Neighbourhood Police Post sited directly across the road from Ama Keng Chinese Temple in Lim Chu Kang, the station was closed and demolished in 1980, currently replaced by a military training area.
 Bukit Panjang Neighbourhood Police Post (old)
 Pasir Panjang Neighbourhood Police Post (old) – closed and vacated in 1986 following the inauguration of Pasir Panjang NPP & West Coast NPP. Demolished in 1991, the surrounding land at site was redeveloped as a private condominium – The Spectrum.
 Woodlands Neighbourhood Police Post – closed in 1999 (located within the old Woodlands Checkpoint building since 1980), Woodlands Neighbourhood Police Centre has since taken over its duty.
 Kranji Neighbourhood Police Post – closed and vacated in 1997 following the inauguration of Yew Tee NPP, building was demolished for land clearing to build factory.
 Woodlands West Neighbourhood Police Centre – closed in 2018 and merged with the new Woodlands Police Division building

Police Coast Guard
 Kallang Regional Base – vacated in 2007, relocated to Brani Regional Base at Pulau Brani, now occupied by National Cadet Corps (Sea) Kallang Sea Training Centre.
 Jurong Regional Base – vacated in 1999, relocated to Gul Regional Base, base was demolished to make way for the Jurong Island Highway.
 Pulau Sakeng Police Post – closed and vacated in 1987 after the last islander left, the island was subsumed by the land reclamation process of the nearby Pulau Semakau. The Semakau landfill receiving station was built on top of the island after the reclamation process.
 Seletar Regional Base – vacated in 2005, relocated to Loyang Regional Base, base was demolished to make way for the Seletar Aerospace Park.

Dealing with offences committed by officers
Police officers are governed by the Police Force Act (Chapter 235) and its Police Regulations (Chapter 235, Section 28 and 117) of the Singapore Statutes. The disciplinary offences can be found in its schedule. Misfeasance and malfeasance such as blue wall of silence, conduct prejudicial to good order and discipline, corruption, misconduct and malicious prosecution are referred to the Internal Affairs Office (IAO). The Attorney-General's Chambers (AGC) can be consulted to advise the police on its disciplinary proceedings. Police officers can whistleblow their colleagues' official misconducts and wrongdoings by filing official police reports themselves to officially open investigation papers against lawless officers of the law. Full-time police national servicemen are also subjected to the Police (Special Constabulary) Regulations (Chapter 235, Section 85).

SPF HQ spokesperson routinely issues official statements stating that its officers are not only expected to uphold the law, but also to maintain the highest standards of conduct and integrity. The spokesperson added that SPF deals severely with officers who break the law, including charging them in court. Also, SPF usually commence disciplinary proceedings against the officers involved, and as well as suspend them pending internal investigations.

Notable cases
In March 1976, one of Singapore's top prominent senior lawyers, the late Subhas Anandan, was arrested by a corrupt policeman for suspected involvement in a secret society under the Criminal Law (Temporary Provisions) Act. He was remanded without trial in a prison for a few months. Subhas was exonerated and acquitted in November of the same year, following an investigation probe by the Corrupt Practices Investigation Bureau.

On 10 July 2013, ex-policeman Senior Staff Sergeant Iskandar Rahmat — a 14-year veteran award-winning investigation officer — killed a car workshop owner and the man's son, and has since been on the death row from 2017 onward, after failing in his appeal and president clemency against the death sentence. The case was known as the Kovan double murders in Singapore media.

Media outreach efforts
Through the Public Affairs Department, SPF has collaborated with the media industry to produce content that supports and promote the mission and brand of the organisation.

Books
 In the service of the nation, 1985
 999: True Cases from the CID, 1987
 Service to the Nation: 50 years of the Volunteer Special Constabulary, 1998
 Policing Singapore in the 19th & 20th centuries, 2002
 Justice is Done, 2005
 The Adventures of Constable Acai, 1987: A series of crime stories, based on actual crimes from police files were compiled into storybooks from the popular children's magazine Young Generation, about the adventures of a fictional policeman named Constable Acai. They were written by officers from the Crime Prevention Department to instill crime awareness in children during the '80s through to the mid-'90s. The other books in this series are as below:
 More Adventures of Constable Acai, 1989
 Constable Acai Fights Crime, 1996
 Justice is Done 2, 2022

Novels
 Operation Firestorm, 1997

Periodicals
 Singapore Police Magazine
 Police Life, 1971 to present
 Police Life Annual

Television programs
 Documentary
 Crimewatch, 1986–Current
 True Files, 2002–2007
 Drama Series
 Seletar Robbery (实里达大劫案), 1982
 CID '83, 1983
 First Step (踏上征途), 1986: On women in the police force
 Patrol (铁警雄风), 1989: A take on the lives of the men in the Traffic Police Department
 Private Eyes (妙探智多星), 1991
 Ladies in action (霹雳红唇), 1992
 Crime and Passion (執法先鋒), 1992
 Lethal Duo (天使追辑令), 1994
 Dr Justice (法医故事), 1994
 Neighbourhood Heroies (大英雄小人物), 1995
 Triple Nine, 1995–1998: On the adventures of a CID team.
 Secret Files (机密档案), 1995
 The Shadow Mission (地下猎人), 1995
 The Dragons Five (飞龙五将), 1995
 Dr Justice II (法医故事II), 1996
 City Cops (警网双雄), 1996
 Of Cops And Men (城市双雄), 1996
 Pursuit of Justice (石破天惊), 1997
 Act 235 (刑事235), 1998
 Dare To Strike (扫冰者), 14 November 2000: the phrase "Dare to Strike" is the motto of the Central Narcotics Bureau
 The Reunion (顶天立地), 26 December 2001
 Heartlanders, 2002–2005: On two Neighbourhood Police Centre officers
 True Heroes (真心英雄), 5 May 2003: On a rookie Neighbourhood Police Centre officer
 The Frontline (家在前线), 2003: This fictional six-part TV show depicts how Singaporeans cope after the German mastermind of a neo-anarchist organisation sets off a bomb at a naval base as an anti-imperialistic statement against Singapore's ties with the United States. It showcases the capabilities of the Singapore Police Force and the Singapore Armed Forces to deal with terrorism. Many technologies introduced in this series has never been before shown to the public. It is also the only local television series to date to accurately depict the Police's elite Special Tactics and Rescue (STAR) team and the Army's Special Operations Forces (SOF) although the latter unit was never addressed by name in the show. They were instead referred to as "The Commandos".
 When the Time Comes (一线之间), 2004
 The Crime Hunters (心网追凶), 2004
 Police & Thief, 2004–2010
 Life Line, 2005–2007
 Zero to Hero (阴差阳错), 2005
 Without Warning, 2006
 The Undisclosed (迷云二十天), 2006
 C.I.D. (刑警2人组), 12 June 2006
 Metamorphosis (破茧而出), 18 September 2007
 Crime Busters x 2 (叮当神探), 30 September 2008
 Unriddle (最火搭档), 2010
 Vettai : Pledged to Hunt (வேட்டை), 23 November 2010 – 30 March 2011
 C.L.I.F. (警徽天职), 2011: First drama to be produced in close collaboration with the Singapore Police Force. The second, third, fourth, and fifth seasons were aired in 2013, 2014, September 2016 and September 2019 respectively.
 Unriddle 2 (最火搭档2), 2012
 Vettai 2.0: The Next Generation (வேட்டை 2.0), 4 January 2012 – 11 May 2013
 Vettai 3: The Final Judgement (வேட்டை 3), 17 November 2014 – present
 Mata-Mata Season 1, 2013: background post-World War II in Singapore and establish woman police 
 Mata-Mata Season 2, 2014: A New Era, background after separation Singapore from Malaysia and secret society '70s
 Mata-Mata Season 3, 2016: A New Generation, background development Singapore and crime late '70s,early '80s and now

Movies
 The Last Blood (驚天十二小時), 1991
 Ace Cops (妙警点三八), 1996: Telemovie
 Life on the Line (魂断四面佛), 1996: Telemovie
 2000 AD (公元2000), 1999
 After School (放学后), 2004: A film released by the National Crime Prevention Council to harness the power of cinema as a public education tool to reach out to young Singaporeans and their families.

See also

 List of Singapore police officers killed in the line of duty
 List of major crimes in Singapore
 Crime in Singapore
 Project Griffin
 Law enforcement in Singapore
 List of law enforcement agencies
 Internal Security Department
 Corrupt Practices Investigation Bureau

References

Notes

Bibliography

 "In the Service of the Nation", John Drysdale, Federal Publications, 1985 
 "Phoenix: the story of the Home Team ", Felix Soh, Times Editions, 2003 
 "Policing Singapore in the 19th & 20th centuries", Peer M. Akbur, Singapore Police Force, 2002 
 "Singapore Police Force Annual", Singapore Police Force, several editions

External links
 
 
 Organisation, Recruitment, and Training of Police
 Public Order and Internal Security (1989)
 Training the Police
 Police-related Singapore news
 Crossing the generation gap

 
Organisations of the Singapore Government
Crime in Singapore
National Central Bureaus of Interpol
Law enforcement agencies of Singapore